Oakhampton Heights is a suburb of the City of Maitland, New South Wales, Australia.

Heritage listings 
Oakhampton Heights has heritage-listed sites, including:

 55 Scobies Lane: Walka Water Works

References 

City of Maitland